Judy Lynne is an Australian former actress

Lynne had roles in numerous TV serials including  Number 96, Spyforce, Ryan, Boney and  Alvin Purple

However she was best known for the serial The Young Doctors appearing from 1977 until 1979 as Dr. Susan Richards.

Filmography (selected)

External links

Australian actresses
Possibly living people
Year of birth missing (living people)